Elisabeth Tova Bailey is the author of The Sound of a Wild Snail Eating (2010, Algonquin Books) which won the 2010 John Burroughs Medal,  the Natural History Literature category of the 2010 National Outdoor Book Award (joint award), and the non-fiction category of the 2012 William Saroyan International Prize for Writing.  In the book she describes her observations of an individual land snail in the species Neohelix albolabris which lived in a terrarium next to her while she was confined to bed through Chronic Fatigue Syndrome.

In her essay A Green World Deep in Winter: The Bedside Terrarium, published in the Yale Journal for Humanities in Medicine, Bailey describes how Nathaniel Bagshaw Ward, inventor of the Wardian case, had published during the mid 19th century a report on the "Use of Closed Cases in Illness", explaining the benefit of a terrarium to bed-ridden patients in order to "beguile many a weary hour".

References

External links 

Year of birth missing (living people)
Living people
American non-fiction environmental writers
21st-century American women writers
American women non-fiction writers
21st-century American non-fiction writers